The Adams site (15FU4) is a Mississippian culture archaeological site located near Hickman in Fulton County, Kentucky, on Bayou de Chien, a creek that drains into the nearby Mississippi River. 

The 7.25-hectare site is built over the remains of a Late Woodland village. It has a central group of platform mounds around a central plaza and another smaller plaza area to the southwest of the largest mound. The site was occupied from 1100 to 1500 CE during the Medley (1100 to 1300) and Jackson (1300 to 1500) phases of the local chronology.

See also 
 White Site: a ≤nearby and possibly related site
 National Register of Historic Places listings in Fulton County, Kentucky

References

External links
 Early shell tempering in far Western Kentucky

Middle Mississippian culture
Geography of Fulton County, Kentucky
Archaeological sites on the National Register of Historic Places in Kentucky
National Register of Historic Places in Fulton County, Kentucky
Late Woodland period
Mounds in Kentucky